The women's individual sabre competition in fencing at the 2012 Olympic Games in London was held on 1 August at the ExCeL Exhibition Centre.

South Korea's Kim Ji-Yeon won the gold medal. Thirty-two fencers from 24 countries competed.

Competition format

The competition was a single-elimination tournament with a bronze medal final for semifinal losers.

Schedule 
All times are British Summer Time (UTC+1)

Results

Finals

Top half

Bottom half

Results

References

Women's sabre
2012 in women's fencing
Women's events at the 2012 Summer Olympics